This is a list of artists from, or associated, with Lebanon.

A
 Shafic Abboud (1926-2004), painter
 Lamia Maria Abillama (born 1962), photographer
 Zeina Abirached (born 1981), illustrator and comic artist
 Etel Adnan (born 1925), poet and visual artist
 Georges Akl, painter
 Rabih Alameddine (born 1959), painter
 Suzanne Alaywan (born 1974), poet and painter
 Ziad Antar (born 1978), filmmaker and photographer
 Zena Assi (born 1974), painter

B
 Ayman Baalbaki (born 1975), painter
 Lara Baladi (born 1969), photographer and multimedia artist
 Mouna Bassili Sehnaoui (born 1945), painter
 Kiki Bokassa (born 1975), conceptual artist
 Gregory Buchakjian (born 1971), filmmaker and photographer

C
 Huguette Caland (born 1931), painter
 Chaouki Chamoun (born 1942), artist
 Rafic Charaf (1932-2003), painter
 Youmna Chlala, artist, writer
 Saloua Raouda Choucair ( 1916-2017), painter and sculptor
 Daoud Corm (1852-1930), painter
 Chucrallah Fattouh (born 1956), painter and sculptor

D
 Tagreed Darghouth (born 1979), painter
 Ali Dirani (born 1986), graphic artist

F
 Derrie Fakhoury (born 1930), painter and medal artist
 Moustafa Farroukh (1901-1957), painter
 Farid Mansour  (1929-2010), sculptor and painter

G
 César Gemayel (1898-1958), painter
 Mai Ghoussoub (1952-2007), artist and publisher

H
 Mona Hatoum (born 1952), video and installation artist
 Youssef Howayek (1883-1962), painter and sculptor

J
 Ghada Jamal (born 1955), painter
 Lamia Joreige (born 1972), visual artist and filmmaker
 Nabil Kanso (born 1946), painter
 Nadim Karam (born 1957), painter and sculptor
 Mireille Kassar (born 1963), artist and film-maker
 Omran Al-Kaysi (born 1943), artist and art critic
 Helen Khal (1923-2009), artist
 Mahmoud Kahil (1936-2003), cartoonist
 Zena El Khalil (born 1976), artist

M
 Michel Tamer artist

N
 Nabil Nahas (born 1949), artist

R
 Rudy Rahme (born 1967), sculptor, painter and poet
Walid Raad (born 1967), media artist
 Mohammad Rawas (born 1951), painter and printmaker
 Aref Rayess (1928-2005), painter and sculptor

S
 Pierre Sadek (died 2013), cartoonist
 Walid Sadek (born 1966), conceptual artist
 Ramzi T. Salamé (born 1953), writer and painter
 Samir Sammoun (born 1952), painter
 Hanibal Srouji (born 1957), painter

T
 Lidya Tchakerian (born 1959), artist
 Jalal Toufic, artist and filmmaker

Y
 Paola Yacoub (born 1966), artist

Z
 Akram Zaatari (born 1966), filmmaker and photographer  
 Maya Zankoul (born 1986), author and comic artist
 Salwa Zeidan artist and sculptor
 Lamia Ziadé (born 1968), illustrator and visual artist

See also
 List of Lebanese people

References

Artists

Lists of artists by nationality